

Festivals
Canadian International Dragon Boat Festival
Parade of Lost Souls
Queer Arts Festival
Vancouver International Burlesque Festival
Vancouver Cherry Blossom Festival
Vancouver Pride Festival

Cultural festivals
Gung Haggis Fat Choy - Scottish/Chinese festival

Dance festivals
Vancouver International Dance Festival

Film & stage festivals
Bard on the Beach
DOXA Documentary Film Festival
PuSh International Performing Arts Festival
Vancouver Asian Film Festival
Vancouver Fringe Festival
Vancouver International Film Festival
Vancouver Queer Film Festival

Fireworks & lights festivals
Celebration of Light

Food & beverage festivals
Eat! Vancouver

Literary festivals
The Word on the Street

Music festivals
Vancouver Folk Music Festival
Vancouver International Jazz Festival

Pop culture festivals
Vancouver Halloween Parade & Expo

See also

List of festivals in British Columbia 
List of festivals in Canada

Festivals
and
Vancouver